Voltz is a surname. Notable people with the surname include:

Philippe-Louis Voltz (1785–1840), French geologist and paleontologist
Johann Michael Voltz (1784–1858), German painter, graphic artist, and cartoonist
Ray Voltz, American soccer player
Lynda Voltz (born 1965), Australian politician
Alexander Voltz (born 1999), Australian composer

See also
Holtz